Renier Devon Erasmus is a South African rugby union player who most recently played with the . His regular position is flanker.

Career

Youth

He was banned for three months in 2012 after testing positive for banned substance methylhexanamine.

Senior career

He was included in the senior squad for the 2013 Vodacom Cup, but failed to play any matches. He came on as a half-time substitute to make his first class debut.

In 2014, he was included in the Despatch side that participated in the 2014 SARU Community Cup.

References

South African rugby union players
Eastern Province Elephants players
Living people
1991 births
Doping cases in rugby union
Rugby union flankers
Rugby union players from Port Elizabeth